The Morrill County Courthouse, located on Main St. between 6th and 7th Sts. in Bridgeport, Nebraska, was built in 1909.  It is a Classical Revival style building designed by the Eisentraut Company of Kansas City.  It was listed on the National Register of Historic Places in 1990.

It was found to be historically significant as a center of local government, and architecturally significant as "an excellent example of public architecture in the community".

References

Courthouses on the National Register of Historic Places in Nebraska
Neoclassical architecture in Nebraska
Government buildings completed in 1909
Buildings and structures in Morrill County, Nebraska
County courthouses in Nebraska
Historic districts on the National Register of Historic Places in Nebraska
National Register of Historic Places in Morrill County, Nebraska